Pierre Garat may refer to:

 Pierre-Jean Garat (1764–1823), French singer
 Pierre Garat (civil servant) (1919–1976), civil servant of Vichy France